District 11 is an urban district (quận) of Ho Chi Minh City, the largest city in Vietnam.
As of 2010, the district had a population of 232,536 and an area of 5 km². It is divided into 16 small subsets which are called wards (phường), numbered from Ward 1 to Ward 16.

Geographical location

District 11 borders Tân Bình District to the north, District 5 to the south, District 6 and Tân Phú District to the west, and District 10 to the east.

Cultural spots
Đầm Sen Park
Phú Thọ Stadium

References

Districts of Ho Chi Minh City